Crankin' is an album by American trombonist Curtis Fuller recorded in 1973 and released on the Mainstream label.

Reception

The AllMusic website awarded the album 3½ stars stating "At the time, this was his most adventurous playing in quite a while".

Track listing
All compositions by Curtis Fuller
 "Crankin'" – 6:53   
 "Maze" – 10:56   
 "Black Bath" – 9:30   
 "Ballade" – 4:52   
 "The Spirit" – 5:35

Personnel
Curtis Fuller – trombone
Ramon Morris – tenor saxophone
Bill Hardman – trumpet
Bill Washer – guitar
George Cables – electric piano
Stanley Clarke –  bass, electric bass
Lenny White – drums, electric percussion

References 

1971 albums
Curtis Fuller albums
Mainstream Records albums
Albums produced by Bob Shad